The Friars Senior Society of the University of Pennsylvania, commonly nicknamed Friars, is the oldest undergraduate secret society at the University of Pennsylvania in Philadelphia, Pennsylvania. Founded in 1899, it recognizes student leaders who have made a significant contribution to the University in all areas of campus life. The organization remains the most active secret senior society at the University with over 2,000 alumni in the United States and in 24 countries throughout the world.

History
First led by Daniel S. Keller, Jr., Friars was created "to firmly establish uncompromising democracy in all class, college and University activities." In the early years, when violent class contests existed between freshmen and sophomores, Friars served as marshals during these fights. The organization was initially restricted to male leaders, with the first co-ed class formed in the spring of 1971. Throughout its storied history, Friars have shaped many aspects of Penn life such as the addition of straw hats to Hey Day in 1949 and the creation of Spring Fling in 1975.

Each full class consists of 30 to 36 seniors. Friars promotes interaction between those from all walks of life who have given their time and energies to making the University what it is; hence, the name Friars, for those who sacrifice their time during college to meaningful activities. The group is governed by the Friars Graduate Board and organizes activities for both undergraduate and graduate members.

Membership 
Friars are chosen in the well-known Tapping Service. Two-thirds of the group are nominated or “tapped” for membership in the spring of one's junior year by current members. The other third is filled in the fall of one's senior year through a similar process. Membership is intentionally drawn from all walks of campus: the only common thread is that every member of the society is a recognized senior leader and contributes to the greater Penn community. The group proudly consists of those making a difference in the athletic arena, the performing arts, student government, the Greek system, publications, as well as assorted entrepreneurs and community activists and organizers. Members are encouraged to attend sporting events, shows, and other campus events featuring fellow Friars, and they get together and perform various community service projects throughout their senior year.

Notable Friars 
Joe Biden - 46th President of the United States and 47th Vice President of the United States. Friars Honorary Member: inducted in 2018 while a professor at the University of Pennsylvania.
Walter Annenberg - Billionaire, publisher, philanthropist and U.S. Ambassador to the United Kingdom.
Brian L. Roberts - Billionaire, chairman and CEO of Comcast.
Andrea Mitchell - American television journalist, anchor, reporter and Chief Foreign Affairs Correspondent for NBC News.
Elizabeth Banks - Award-winning actress, director and producer, famous for her role in The Hunger Games movie franchise.
Vanessa Bayer - American actress and comedian best known as a cast member on Saturday Night Live.
Harold Ford, Jr. - United States Congressman from Tennessee.
Ed Rendell - 45th Governor of Pennsylvania.
Michael Nutter - 98th Mayor of the City of Philadelphia.
David Montgomery - Owner and CEO of the Philadelphia Phillies.
Mark DeRosa - American former professional baseball player.
Jack McCloskey - NBA Coach and General Manager.
Brent Novoselsky - former American football player in the NFL.
Jim Finn - former American football player in the NFL.
Fran Dunphy - former Penn and now Temple head basketball coach.
George William McClelland - former President of the University of Pennsylvania, 1944–1948.
Martin Meyerson - former President of the University of Pennsylvania, 1970–1981.
Sheldon Hackney - former President of the University of Pennsylvania, 1981–1993.
Claire Fagin - former President of the University of Pennsylvania, 1993–1994.

Notes

References

1899 establishments in Pennsylvania
Honor societies
University of Pennsylvania
Student societies in the United States
Student organizations established in 1899